Jonathan Leroy Staggers, Jr. (born December 14, 1948 in Richmond, Virginia) is a former professional American football wide receiver in the National Football League. He was a star football player for Helias High School in Jefferson City, Missouri.  He starred as a running back/wide receiver at the University of Missouri before playing six seasons for the Pittsburgh Steelers, the Green Bay Packers, and the Detroit Lions of the NFL.  He is the first cousin of tennis great Arthur Ashe. His father, Jonathan Staggers, was a basketball coach at  Lincoln University  Hayward State University and Claflin College

NFL career
Staggers started his career with two years with the Pittsburgh Steelers: 1970 and 1971. The Steelers drafted him out of the University of Missouri in the 5th round (the 105th pick overall) in 1970. This was the same draft in which the Steelers picked two future Pro Football Hall of Famers: Terry Bradshaw and Mel Blount. Shortly before the start of the 1972 season, the Steelers waived Staggers and the Green Bay Packers claimed him on September 13, 1972.

Staggers played for the Packers from 1972-1974. 1973 and 1974 proved to be the most productive seasons of his career. Staggers led the Packers both seasons in both receiving yardage and punt return yardage. His 85 yard punt return for a touchdown against the Houston Oilers in 1972 was the longest punt return that season.  But with the Packers under the new management of Bart Starr, Staggers lost his wide receiver starting job to Ken Payne, and his punt return job to rookie Willard Harrell, and the Packers waived him shortly before the start of the season. The Detroit Lions claimed him off of waivers on September 22, 1975. Staggers played in 5 games as a wide receiver for the Lions, starting in 4. Unlike with the Steelers and Packers, however, he was not used as a punt returner in Detroit.

Post-career honors
The 1969 University of Missouri Tigers football team, of which Staggers was a member, was inducted into the Missouri Sports Hall of Fame. The Associated Press ranked them as the #6 team in the nation at the close of the season. The team was coached by Dan Devine, who would later coach Staggers with the Packers. Staggers was one of five members of the 1969 Tigers to play in the NFL, including wide receiver Mel Gray.

Post-NFL life
After an injury led to his retirement from pro football, Staggers spent six years working as an actor at the American Conservatory Theater. Since 1998, he has been a Breema instructor and practitioner in the San Francisco Bay Area. He studied under spiritual teacher Dr. Jean Klein and Way of the Peaceful Warrior author Dan Millman. He also serves on the Players Advisory Board of the Northern California Chapter of the National Football League Alumni.

References

1948 births
Living people
Players of American football from Richmond, Virginia
American football wide receivers
Missouri Tigers football players
Pittsburgh Steelers players
Green Bay Packers players
Detroit Lions players